The Machiguenga (also Matsigenka, Matsigenga) are an indigenous people who live in the high jungle, ormontaña, area on the eastern slopes of the Andes and in the Amazon Basin jungle regions of southeastern Peru. Their population in 2020 amounted to about 18,000. Formerly they were hunter-gatherer but today the majority are sedentary swidden cultivators. The main crops grown are manioc, maiz, and bananas, but today commercial crops such as coffee and cacao are increasingly important. Their main source of protein used to be peccary and monkeys but today fish has become more important as game animals have become increasingly scarce as a consequence of the encroachment from highland immigrants to the area and the exploitation of the Camisea gas finds.

Culture
Most Machiguenga do not have personal names. Members of the same band are identified by kin terminology, while members of a different band or tribe are referred to by their Spanish names.

Most Matsigenka are today Christian (mainly Catholic) but commonly they still entertain animists notions. Spirits and demons influence everyday life whereas the creator gods have withdrawn and are indifferent to humans. Shamans used to play a prominent role in local society, today though they are less visible and certain of their functions have been taken over by healers.

While quite accomplished in using plants and herbs as medicine, the Matsiguenka are susceptible to new infectious diseases brought in from the outside world. In many communities they have, however, been spared from COVID-19. The Matsigenka used to wear a handwoven and homemade cotton tunic made by women, in local Spanish called a cushmas, designed with a V neck for men, and straight neck for women. They fashion huts using palm tree poles as a frame, with palm leaves thatched for the roof. Literacy rates for settled groups range from 30% to 60%. Each extended family group is governed by a self-appointed "headman".

Family life
Formerly women married around the age of 16 while today they commonly enter into family relations some years later. Women have an average of eight to ten pregnancies. As with many indigenous tribes, the mortality rate for infants is high. During the first year(s) of marriage the relation is often unstable and separation is common. The Matsigenka are uxorilocal, which means that the man moves to his wife who usually still live with her parents. During the early time of their relation they prepare their own garden and they build their own house not far from the woman's parents. This means that the relation between mothers and daughters are strong while the position of inmarrying men, who come from other family constellations, may be experienced as vulnerable.  Formerly prominent men had multiple wives.

Language
The Machiguenga language belongs to the Campa group of Machi puceran Maipurean (Arawakan) language family, which is spoken by approximately 12,000 people in Peru. There are several dialects of Matsigenka: the Matsigenka of the Upper Urubamba, that of the Lower Urubamba, that of the Manu area Machiguenga proper and what some refer to as Nanti and consider as a proper language but that Matsigenka people see as a  variety of Matsigenka.

See also

 Antisuyu
 Ashaninka
 Harakmbut
 Shipibo
 Yanesha

Notes

References
 Rosegren, D. 2004. 'Los Matsigenka', in Guía Etnográfica de la Alta Amazonía, in Guía Etnográfica de la Alta Amazonía  pp. 1-157,  ed. by Santos-Granero, F. and F. Barclay. Balboa: Smithsonian Tropical Research Institute, and Lima: Instituto Frances de Estudios Andinos.
Rosengren, D. 2017. 'Marriage Matsigenka Style: Some Critical Reflections of Marriage Practices', pp. 15-35, in Valentine, P., S. Beckerman, and C. Alès "The Anthropology of Marriage in Lowland South America. [University Press of Florida]

Further reading
 The Storyteller (1987), novel by Mario Vargas Llosa that includes recounting of Machiguenga cosmology.
 Baksh, M. (1990) Time Allocation among the Machiguenga of Camana (Peru). New Haven, CT: HRAF Press.
 Campbell, Lyle. (1997). American Indian Languages: The historical linguistics of Native America. New York: Oxford University Press. .
 Deyermenjian, G. (1988) Land Rights, Cultural Survival and Innovation among Indigenous Peoples of the Western Amazon Basin: The Case of the Machiguenga. Master's Thesis, Clark University, International Development Dept.
 Henrich J et al. (2005) " 'Economic man' in cross-cultural perspective: Behavioral experiments in 15 small-scale societies", Behavioral and Brain Sciences 28:795-+
 Ohl, J. 2004. The economy of the Matsigenka – ecotourism as a chance for sustainable development?, Ph.D. thesis, University of Greifswald, Greifswald.
 Ohl, J. 2004, El eco-turismo como opportunidad para un desarrollo sostenible? Eschborn, Germany, Deutsche Gesellschaft fur Technische Zusammenarbeit (GTZ) GmbH.
 Ohl, J., A. Wezel, G. H. Shepard Jr., and D. W. Yu. 2007. "Swidden agriculture in a human-inhabited protected area: The Matsigenka native communities of Manu National Park, Peru," in Environment, Development, and Sustainability
 Ohl-Schacherer, J., G. H. Shepard Jr., H. Kaplan, C. A. Peres, T. Levi, and D. W. Yu. 2007. "The sustainability of subsistence hunting by Matsigenka native communities in Manu National Park, Peru", Conservation Biology 21:1174–1185.
 Ohl-Schacherer, J., E. Mannigel, C. Kirkby, G. H. Shepard Jr, and D. W. Yu. 2008. "Indigenous ecotourism in the Amazon: A case study of “Casa Matsiguenka” in Manu National Park, Peru",  Environmental Conservation.
 Solís Fonseca, Gustavo. (2003). Lenguas en la amazonía peruana, Lima: edición por demanda.
 Pancorbo, Luis: Río de América, Laertes. Barcelona, 2003.
 Shepard GH (1997) "Noun classification and ethnozoological classification in Machiguenga, an Arawakan language of the Peruvian Amazon", The Journal of Amazonian Languages 1:20–57
 Shepard G (1997) "Monkey hunting with the Machiguenga: medicine, magic, ecology and mythology", paper presented at the American Anthropological Association Meetings
 Shepard GH (1998) "Psychoactive plants and ethnopsychiatric medicines of the Matsigenka", Journal of Psychoactive Drugs 30:321-332
 Shepard GH (1999) "Resource use and ecology of the Matsigenka of the eastern slopes of the Cordillera Vilcabamba", In: Schulenberg TS (ed) A Rapid Biological Assessment of the Northern Cordillera Vilcabamba, Peru, vol RAP Working Papers No. 11. Conservation International, Washington, DC
 Shepard GH (1999) Pharmacognosy and the Senses in two Amazonian Societies. In: Department of Anthropology. University of California, Berkeley
 Shepard GH (1999) "Shamanism and diversity: A Matsigenka perspective", In: Posey DA (ed) Cultural and Spiritual Values of Biodiversity, vol U.N.E.P. Global Biodiversity Assessment, Vol 2. United Nations Environmental Programme and Intermediate Technology Publications, London, pp 93–95
 Shepard GH, Rummenhoeller K (2000) "Paraiso para quem?  Populções indígenas e o Parque Nacional do Manu (Peru)". In: XXII Reunião Brasileira de Antropologia. Fórum de Pesquisa 3: “Conflitos Socioambientais e Unidades de Conservação”, Brasília, Brasil
 Shepard GH, Yu DW, Lizarralde M, Italiano M (2001) "Rain forest habitat classification among the Matsigenka of the Peruvian Amazon", Journal of Ethnobiology 21:1–38
 Shepard GH, Yu DW (2001) "Verificación etnobotánica de imágenes de satélite:  La intersección de conocimientos tradicionales y cientifícos", Debate Agrario 33:19–24
 Shepard GH, Chicchón A (2001) "Resource use and ecology of the Matsigenka of the eastern slopes of the Cordillera Vilcabamba", In: Alonso LEea (ed) Social and Biological Assessments of the Cordillera de Vilcabamba, Peru. Conservation International, Washington, DC, pp 164–174
 Shepard GH (2002) Primates in Matsigenka subsistence and worldview. In: Fuentes A, Wolfe L (eds) Primates face to face. Cambridge University Press, Cambridge, pp 101–136
 Shepard GH, Yu DW (2002) "Vanishing Cultures" (Comment). New York Review of Books 50:92
 Shepard GH, Yu DW, Nelson B, Lizarralde M, Italiano M (2004) "Ethnobotanical Ground-Truthing and Forest Diversity in the Western Amazon", In: Maffi L, Carlson T, López-Zent E (eds) Ethnobotany and conservation of biocultural diversity, New York Botanical Gardens (Advances in Economic Botany), New York
 Shepard GH (August 1998.) "Uncontacted native groups and petrochemical exploration in the Peruvian Amazon", In: International Society for Anthropological and Ethnological Sciences (ICAES) Conference, Williamsburg, VA
 Shepard GH, Rummenhoeller K, Ohl J, Yu DW (in press) "Trouble in paradise: indigenous populations, anthropological policies, and biodiversity conservation in Manu National Park, Peru", Journal of Sustainable Forestry
 Yu DW, Shepard GH (1998) "Is beauty in the eye of the beholder?", Nature 396:321-322
 Yu DW, Shepard GH (1999) "The mystery of female beauty", Nature 399:216
 Yu DW, Proulx SM, Shepard GH (2008) "Masculinity, marriage, and the paradox of the lek", In: Swami V, Furnham A (eds) The Body Beautiful, Palgrave Macmillan, New York, pp 88–107

External links
Machiguenga at Native Planet
Machiguenga at Shinai

 Matsigenka
 Allen Johnson: Matsigenka Research
 Matsigenka Texts collected by Lev Michael and Christine Beier at the Archive of the Indigenous Languages of Latin America.

Indigenous peoples in Peru
Indigenous peoples of the Amazon
Hunter-gatherers of South America